Veronika Klechová (born 5 May 1989) is a Slovak football midfielder currently playing in the Slovak First League for Slovan Bratislava, with whom she has also played the Champions League. She has been a member of the Slovak national team since debuting at 17 in 2006. In 2008 she was named the best Slovak player of the year.

When Klechová's partner Filip Kiss was loaned from Cardiff City to Ross County in January 2014, she made a similar move from Cardiff City Ladies to Inverness City.

References

1989 births
Living people
Slovak women's footballers
Cardiff City Ladies F.C. players
Slovakia women's international footballers
Slovak expatriate sportspeople in England
Expatriate women's footballers in Scotland
Women's association football midfielders
Expatriate women's footballers in Wales
ŠK Slovan Bratislava (women) players